The Paite people, are a Tibeto-Burmese ethnic group in Northeast India.

See also
 List of Scheduled Tribes in India

References 

Ethnic groups in Northeast India
Scheduled Tribes of Manipur
Ethnic groups in South Asia